Tracking software may mean:

 GPS tracking software
 Multitrack recording software
 Music tracker
 Computer surveillance software
 Employee monitoring software
 Email tracking 
 Chat log
 Keystroke logging
 Parental controls
 Spyware
 Mobile phone tracking
 Website tracking